Captain Dirk Meinerts Hahn, sometimes spelt Dirk Meinertz Hahn (born 1804 in Westerland, Sylt, died 1860) was the captain of the ship Zebra that he captained to South Australia where the town of Hahndorf was named after him. A monument dedicated to him in Hahndorf was unveiled in 1939.

References

External links
Captain Hahn describes his voyage with the "Zebra" emigrants (Hahndorf)
 VIAF item

German expatriates in Australia
German sailors
People from Sylt
1804 births
1860 deaths